A mantilla is a traditional Spanish and Latin American liturgical lace or silk veil or shawl worn over the head and shoulders, often over a high comb called a peineta, popular with women in Spain, as well as in Latin America. It is also worn by some Catholic women and Plymouth Brethren women in various parts of the globe, Mennonite women in Argentina, and without the peineta by Eastern Orthodox women in Russia, often white, with the ends crossed over neck and draped over the opposite shoulder. For these denominations, the mantilla is worn as a Christian headcovering by women during church services, as well as during special occasions. A smaller version of the mantilla is called a toquilla.

History
The lightweight ornamental mantilla came into use in the warmer regions of Spain towards the end of the 16th century, and ones made of lace became popular with women in the 17th and 18th centuries, being depicted in portraits by Diego Velázquez and Goya. With Spain being largely a Christian country, the mantilla is a Spanish adaption of the Christian practice of women wearing headcoverings during prayer and worship (cf. ).

As Christian missionaries from Spain entered the Americas, the wearing of the mantilla as a Christian headcovering was brought to the New World. Fray Nicolás García Jerez, who in the 19th century served as the Bishop of Nicaragua and Costa Rica, as well as the Governor of Nicaragua, mandated that mantillas be opaque and not made of transparent lace; women who continued to wear thin mantillas were excommunicated from the Catholic Church.

In the 19th century, Queen Isabella II actively encouraged the use of the mantilla. The practice diminished after her abdication in 1870, and by 1900 the use of the mantilla became largely limited to church services, as well as formal occasions such as bullfights, Holy Week and weddings.

In Spain, women still wear mantillas during Holy Week (the week leading to Easter), bullfights and weddings. Also a black mantilla is traditionally worn when a woman has an audience with the Pope and a white mantilla is appropriate for a church wedding, but can be worn at other ceremony occasions as well. In accordance with what is known as the privilège du blanc, only the queen of Spain and selected other Catholic wives of Catholic sovereigns can wear a white mantilla during an audience with the Pope.

In Argentina, many women who are Mennonite Christians wear the mantilla as a Christian headcovering. Traditional Catholic women and Plymouth Brethren women in various parts of the globe use it for the same purpose.

Peineta

A peineta, similar in appearance to a large comb, is used to hold up a mantilla. This ornamental comb, usually in tortoiseshell color, originated in the 19th century. It consists of a convex body and a set of prongs and is often used in conjunction with the mantilla. It adds the illusion of extra height to the wearer and also holds the hair in place when worn during weddings, processions and dances. It is a consistent element of some regional costumes of Valencia and Andalusia and it is also often found in costumes used in the Moorish and Gypsy influenced music and dance called Flamenco.

See also
Christian headcovering
Easter bonnet
Mob cap

References

Notes

Citations

External links

Historia de la mantilla y forma de uso
SpanishPassion

Catholicism and women
Non-clerical religious clothing
Catholic religious clothing
Spanish clothing
Veils